Publius Pinarius Mamercinus Rufus was a Roman senator who held the consulship alongside Gaius Julius Iulus in 489 BC.

Family
Rufus was the first member of the gens Pinaria to attain the consulship. The Pinarii were an ancient patrician family of Rome, whose origins were said to go back to the founding of the city.

Biography
In 489 BC, he was elected consul with Gaius Julius Iulus as his colleague.

Livy says that, during their term, games were held and a host of the Volsci were invited to see them. The man who invited them, Attius Tullius Aufidius, warned Rufus and Iulus that the Volsci may commit an act similar to that of the Sabines in the Rape of the Sabines just a couple years earlier. The consuls then shared Aufidius' suspicions with the Senate, and the Senate decreed that the Volsci should leave the city. The Volsci were indignant that they should have to leave the games without reason, and a conflict began between them and the Romans.

In 488 BC, Rufus was one of the consular envoys sent to negotiate with the Volsci, and with Gaius Marcius Coriolanus, who was a Roman exile leading the Volsci.

Notes

Bibliography

Primary sources
 Livy, The History of Rome, Book II

Secondary sources
 
 

5th-century BC Roman consuls
Mamercinus Rufus, Publius
5th-century BC diplomats